Thomas H. Paynter (1851–1921) was a U.S. Senator from Kentucky from 1907 to 1913. Senator Paynter may also refer to:

Lemuel Paynter (1788–1863), Pennsylvania State Senate
Samuel Paynter (1768–1845), Delaware State Senate

See also
William Rock Painter (1863–1947), Missouri State Senate